KTI – Menschen lügen, Beweise nicht is a German television series.

See also
List of German television series

External links
 

2007 German television series debuts
2007 German television series endings
German-language television shows
Sat.1 original programming
RTL Zwei original programming